Richard Jay Belzer (August 4, 1944 – February 19, 2023) was an American actor, comedian and author. He is best known for his role as detective and sergeant John Munch, whom he portrayed for 23 years in the NBC police drama series Homicide: Life on the Street, Law & Order: Special Victims Unit and several guest appearances on other series.

Early life and education
Belzer was born in Bridgeport, Connecticut on August 4, 1944, to a Jewish family. He described his mother as frequently physically abusive, and he declared that his comedy career began when trying to make her laugh to distract her from abusing him and his brother. After graduating from Fairfield Warde High School, Belzer worked as a reporter for the Bridgeport Post.

Belzer attended Dean College, which was then known as Dean Junior College, in Franklin, Massachusetts, but was expelled.

Career

Stand-up
After his first divorce, Belzer relocated to New York City, moved in with singer Shelley Ackerman, and began working as a stand-up comic at Pips, The Improv, and Catch a Rising Star. He participated in the Channel One comedy group that satirized television and became the basis for the cult movie The Groove Tube, in which Belzer played the costar of the ersatz TV show The Dealers.

Belzer was the audience warm-up comedian for Saturday Night Live and made three guest appearances on the show between 1975 and 1980. He also opened for musician Warren Zevon during his tour supporting the release of his album Excitable Boy.

Film
In the late 1970s and early 1980s, Belzer became an occasional film actor. A short skit of a younger Belzer can be found on Sesame Street in a season 9 episode in 1978 when two young men attempt a picnic and boat ride, only to be thwarted by a dog who eats their food. He is noted for minor roles in Fame, Café Flesh, Night Shift, Scarface, and Fletch Lives. He appeared in the music videos for the Mike + The Mechanics song "Taken In", the Pat Benatar song "Le Bel Age", and the Kansas song "Can't Cry Anymore". He appeared in A Very Brady Sequel as an LAPD detective.

Radio
In addition to his film career, Belzer was a featured player on the National Lampoon Radio Hour with co-stars John Belushi, Chevy Chase, Bill Murray, Gilda Radner, and Harold Ramis, a half-hour comedy program aired on 600 plus U.S. stations from 1973 to 1975. Several of his sketches were released on National Lampoon albums, drawn from the Radio Hour, including several bits in which he portrayed a pithy call-in talk show host named "Dick Ballantine".

In the late 1970s, he co-hosted Brink & Belzer on WNBC radio (660 AM) in New York City. He was a frequent guest on The Howard Stern Show. Following the departure of Randi Rhodes from Air America Radio, Belzer guest-hosted the afternoon program on the network.

Belzer was a regular guest on the right-wing radio show of Alex Jones and appeared on the episode covering the Boston Marathon bombing, in which he referred to the bombing as a false flag event.

Television
In the 1980s, Belzer briefly starred in The Richard Belzer Show on Cinemax, and hosted the Lifetime cable TV talk show, Hot Properties. By the 1990s, he was appearing frequently on television. He was a regular on The Flash as a news anchor and reporter. In several episodes of Lois & Clark: The New Adventures of Superman, he played Inspector William Henderson.

He followed that with starring roles on the Baltimore-based Homicide: Life on the Street (1993–1999) and the New York City-based Law & Order: Special Victims Unit (1999–2013), portraying police detective John Munch in both series. Barry Levinson, Executive Producer of Homicide, said Belzer was a "lousy actor" in audition when he read lines from the script for "Gone for Goode", the first episode in the series. Levinson asked Belzer to take time to reread and practice the material, then read it again. At his second reading, Levinson said Belzer was "still terrible", but that the actor eventually found confidence in his performance.

In addition, Belzer played Munch in episodes on seven other series and in a sketch on one talk show, making Munch the only fictional character to appear on eleven different television shows played by a single actor. These shows were on six different networks:
 Homicide: Life on the Street (NBC)
 Law & Order (NBC)
 The X-Files (Fox)
 The Beat (UPN)
 Law & Order: Trial by Jury (NBC)
 Belzer's appearance on Trial by Jury, which aired April 15, 2005, made him the third actor ever to play the same character in six different prime time TV series. The other two actors are John Ratzenberger and George Wendt, who played Cliff Clavin and Norm Peterson, respectively, in Cheers (1982–93); St. Elsewhere (1985); The Tortellis (1987); Wings (1990); The Simpsons (1994); and Frasier (2002).
 Arrested Development (Fox)
 The Wire (HBO)
 30 Rock (NBC)
 The characters are watching a Law & Order: Special Victims Unit episode; a scene shot for 30 Rock
 Law & Order: Special Victims Unit (NBC)
 Jimmy Kimmel Live! (ABC)
 Unbreakable Kimmy Schmidt (Netflix), in which he played a John Munch-like character on a fictional Law & Order spinoff.

In March 2016, executive producer Warren Leight announced Belzer would return to reprise the role in a May 2016 episode of Law & Order: Special Victims Unit, titled "Fashionable Crimes".

Belzer portrayed Det. Munch for 22 consecutive seasons on Homicide (7 seasons) and Law & Order: SVU (15 seasons), which exceeded the previous primetime live-action record of twenty consecutive seasons held by James Arness (who portrayed Marshal Matt Dillon on Gunsmoke from 1955 to 1975) and Kelsey Grammer (as Dr. Frasier Crane on Cheers and Frasier from 1984 to 2004). This record has since been passed by Belzer's SVU co-star Mariska Hargitay.

Belzer appeared in several of Comedy Central's televised broadcasts of Friars Club roasts. On June 9, 2001, Belzer himself was honored by the New York Friars Club and the Toyota Comedy Festival as the honoree of the first-ever roast open to the public. Comedians and friends on the dais included Roastmaster Paul Shaffer; Christopher Walken; Danny Aiello; Barry Levinson; Robert Klein; Bill Maher; SVU costars Mariska Hargitay, Christopher Meloni, Ice-T, and Dann Florek; and Law & Order Jerry Orbach. At the December 1, 2002, roast of Chevy Chase, Belzer said, "The only time Chevy Chase has a funny bone in his body is when I fuck him in the ass."

Belzer voiced the character of Loogie for most of the South Park episode titled "The Tooth Fairy Tats 2000". He and Brian Doyle-Murray were featured in the tenth-season premiere of Sesame Street.

Author
Belzer believed there was a conspiracy to assassinate President John F. Kennedy and wrote five books discussing conspiracy theories:
 UFOs, JFK, and Elvis: Conspiracies You Don't Have to Be Crazy to Believe (2000)
 Dead Wrong: Straight Facts on the Country's Most Controversial Cover-Ups
 Hit List: An In-Depth Investigation into the Mysterious Deaths of Witnesses to the JFK Assassination
 Corporate Conspiracies: How Wall Street Took Over Washington
 Someone Is Hiding Something: What Happened to Malaysia Airlines Flight 370?
Dead Wrong and Hit List were written with journalist David Wayne and reached The New York Times Best Seller list. Someone Is Hiding Something was also written with David Wayne as well as radio talk show host George Noory. Belzer's long-time character, John Munch, was also a believer in conspiracy theories, including the JFK assassination. In 2008, Belzer published a novel, I Am Not a Cop!, about a fictional version of himself investigating a murder.

Personal life
Belzer's first two marriages were to Gail Susan Ross (1966–1972) and boutique manager Dalia Danoch (1976 – c. 1978), both of which ended in divorce. In 1981, in Los Angeles, he met 31-year-old Harlee McBride, a divorcee with two daughters, Bree Benton and Jessica. McBride, who had been seen in Playboy magazine four years earlier in that year's sex-in-cinema feature, in conjunction with Young Lady Chatterley, was appearing in TV commercials for Ford and acting in free theater when she met Belzer at the suggestion of a friend. The two married in 1985 and had a home in Bozouls, France.

Belzer survived testicular cancer in 1983. His HBO special and comedy CD Another Lone Nut pokes fun at this medical incident as well as his status as a well-known conspiracy theorist.

On March 27, 1985, four days before the first WrestleMania, Belzer repeatedly requested on his TV talk show Hot Properties that Hulk Hogan demonstrate a wrestling move. Hogan applied a front facelock, causing him to pass out. When released, he hit the back of his head on the floor. He was dazed, lacerated and briefly hospitalized after waking up. He sued for $5 million and settled out of court for $400,000 in 1990. He refers to this in his HBO stand-up special Another Lone Nut. It helped him pay for a home in Beaulieu-sur-Mer called the "Chez Hogan" or "Hulk Hogan Estate".

Belzer's father and brother both died of suicide, in 1968 and 2014 respectively. His cousin was actor Henry Winkler.

Death
Belzer died at his home on February 19, 2023, at age 78, from complications of unspecified circulatory and respiratory conditions. According to his friend Bill Scheft, a novelist, his last words were: "Fuck you, motherfucker!"

Filmography

Film

Television

Books
 UFOs, JFK, and Elvis: Conspiracies You Don't Have to Be Crazy to Believe, 
 How to Be a Stand-Up Comic, 
 I Am Not a Cop!: A Novel, 
 I Am Not a Psychic!, 
 Dead Wrong: Straight Facts on the Country's Most Controversial Cover-Ups, 
 Hit List: An In-Depth Investigation into the Mysterious Deaths of Witnesses to the JFK Assassination, 
 Someone Is Hiding Something: What Happened to Malaysia Airlines Flight 370?,

References

External links
 
 
 
 NBC Biography
 

1944 births
2023 deaths
20th-century American comedians
20th-century American Jews
20th-century American male actors
21st-century American comedians
21st-century American male actors
21st-century American male writers
American conspiracy theorists
American expatriates in France
American male film actors
American male television actors
American stand-up comedians
American television talk show hosts
Comedians from Connecticut
Connecticut Democrats
Dean College alumni
Jewish American male actors
Jewish American male comedians
Jewish American writers
Male actors from Bridgeport, Connecticut
People from Alpes-Maritimes
People from Aveyron
Writers from Bridgeport, Connecticut